Miladina is a genus of fungi in the family Pyronemataceae. A monotypic genus, it contains the single species Miladina lecithina.

Pyronemataceae
Monotypic Ascomycota genera